You Can Do Magic may refer to:

"You Can Do Magic" (song), a 1982 song by America
"You Can Do Magic", a 1973 song by Limmie & Family Cookin'
You Can Do Magic (album), a 1996 compilation album by America
You Can Do Magic, a television programme broadcast by CITV